Gerum is a populated area, a socken (not to be confused with parish), on the Swedish island of Gotland. It comprises the same area as the administrative Gerum District, established on 1January 2016.

Geography 
Gerum is situated in the south central part of Gotland. The medieval Gerum Church is located in the socken. , Gerum Church belongs to Gerum parish in Fardhems pastorat.

In the south part of Gerum is the  Sandarve Kulle nature reserve.

References

External links 

Objects from Gerum at the Digital Museum by Nordic Museum

Populated places in Gotland County